The All-Knighters are a Canadian professional wrestling tag team consisting of real life brothers Joey and Patrick Carolan, better known by their ring names Joey Knight and Robin Knightwing. One of the top tag teams wrestling in the Canadian independent circuit during the late-1990s, The All-Knighters have also made appearances in both the United Kingdom and the United States.

Among the numerous promotions the All-Knighters have competed include Ron Hutchison's Apocalypse Wrestling Federation, Ultimate Wrestling Alliance, Far North Wrestling, the Frontier Wrestling Alliance, Live Wrestling Entertainment, the National Wrestling Alliance, New England Championship Wrestling and World Xtreme Wrestling. They have also wrestled occasionally for World Wrestling Entertainment, most notably, their appearance at WrestleMania 23 where they were paid by Donald Trump to shave their heads. Later during the event, they accompanied The Undertaker to his match as two of his druids.

Career
Both brothers were big wrestling fans as children and after graduating high school, Joey and Patrick moved from their hometown of Fort Erie, Ontario to Calgary, Alberta and were trained in the famous Hart Family Dungeon. They were trained by Bruce, Smith, Ross and even Stu Hart himself. The boys trained for approximately 1 year before heading back to Fort Erie.

The All Knighters earliest matches took place in Calgary and for Badger State Wrestling in Wisconsin. During this time, they were managed by C.J. Lane, who later parted ways in 1999. It was in only their second match in Wisconsin where Patrick broke his ankle early in the match but continued through the match. After the match Patrick had surgery to put metal plates in his ankle and sidelined the All-Knighters career for almost a year afterwards.

When The All-Knighters were healed and back in action they wrestled throughout Canada, the United States and the United Kingdom for Renegade Wrestling Alliance, United Wrestling Alliance, United States Wrestling Federation and the Frontier Wrestling alliance.

The All-Knighters are well known amongst Canadian wrestling fans for the feud the brothers had during their time in the Apocalypse Wrestling Federation, Ron Hutchison's promotion that was the starting point for Edge, Christian, Trish Stratus, Gail Kim, Tracy Brookshaw and Beth Phoenix among others.

World Wrestling Entertainment (2005, 2007)
The All-Knighters first World Wrestling Entertainment appearance was on July 25, 2005. Joey and Patrick appeared on WWE Raw as ambulance drivers, preparing the stretcher for a match between Edge and Kane. During the match Lita was tombstoned on the ramp and the All-Knighters, dressed as EMTs, put a neck brace on Lita, secured her to the stretcher and took her back to the ambulance. However, Kane appeared and attacked them both, only to steal the ambulance as the episode ended.

At WrestleMania 23 in Detroit, the All-Knighters were hired by WWE to be Donald Trump's head shaving testers. Trump claimed he had never used hair trimmers before and wanted to make sure he would be able to do it right, if he were victorious in the famed Hair vs Hair match involving Trump and Vince McMahon. The boys were paid to have their heads shaved by Trump, with only Joey receiving the hair cut while Patrick was spared. Later that night, the boys appeared as Druids for The Undertaker's entrance. Since then, The All-Knighters have had many tryout matches with the WWE.

Recent years
The All-Knighters currently live in Tampa, Florida wrestling in the Florida-area, Chicago and making multiple trips to the United Kingdom. In the UK Robin has made multiple month long tours, wrestling for the UWA.  Joey has toured less often, but has made several UK tours.  While touring with UWA they would also make occasional appearances for WAW and LWE (Live Wrestling Entertainment). They also have had small parts in various movies and television ads such as The Dukes of Hazzard, The Dark Knight, The Express: The Ernie Davis Story, Style By Jury and many other appearances.

In 2006, Joey appeared in the "Cryme Tyme" training video. He is a preppy white boy who takes a wrong turn and ends up in "the Hood" to be taken out by Cryme Tyme.

Patrick is working on a cruise ship and is wrestling matches with Apocalypse Wrestling Federation.

Joey is currently living in Florida and makes trips back to Canada to wrestle for Apocalypse Wrestling Federation. Joey was married to Beth Phoenix and they have since divorced in 2010.

In 2013 Joey returned to England wrestling for Best of British Wrestling on their annual summer tour and will be returning for 2014.

Joey is featured in the 2019 film "Fighting with My Family".

Championships and accomplishments
Badger State Wrestling
BSW Tag Team Championship (2 times)
Pro Wrestling Illustrated
PWI ranked Robin Knightwing # 323 of the 500 best singles wrestlers of the PWI 500 in 2005.
PWI ranked Joey Knight # 334 of the 500 best singles wrestlers of the PWI 500 in 2005.

References

External links
AllKnighters.ca
JoeyKnight.cjb.net
SLAM! Wrestling  Hall of Fame: The All-Knighters
Questions for the Pros: The All-Knighters
's Family Tree (Archived 2009-10-25)
CageMatch.de - The All-Knighters

Independent promotions teams and stables
WWE teams and stables